Everyday Gourmet with Justine Schofield is an Australian television cooking show, that is hosted by former MasterChef contestant Justine Schofield. It was first broadcast on Network Ten in 2011. The show is directed towards the home-cooked meals and features recipes ranging from simple to the more complex. It regularly features guests, including chefs, food specialists and other former Masterchef contestants. The series also screens on Lifestyle Food.

Episodes

Series 1 (2011)
This is a list of episodes for Series 1 of Everyday Gourmet with Justine Schofield:

Guest Chefs 
Guest chefs on the show include:
Adam Swanson, Chef, Zucca, Adelaide
Callum Hann, MasterChef Series 2 Top 24 Callum's Kitchen
Colin Fassnidge, Chef, Four In Hand, Sydney
Dominique Rizzo, Chef www.dominiquerizzo.com
Lola Berry, Nutritionist www.lolaberry.com
Lucy Kelly, Senior Food Editor, Ask Lucy, Weight Watchers Australasia
Pablo Canamasas, Oil Production Technical Manager, Boundary Bend Limited (Cobram Estate)
Sam Herde, The Vegetable Connection
Scott Pickett, Chef, The Point Albert Park, Melbourne
Skye Craig, Dessert Maniac, Wild Sugar
Tom Niall, Butcher, The Organic Meat Specialist, South Melbourne

References

External links
 
 Recipes
 Official Facebook Page

Australian cooking television series
Network 10 original programming
2011 Australian television series debuts
English-language television shows